Toyd Down and Quarry is a  biological Site of Special Scientific Interest east of Martin in Hampshire.

This site is composed of two parts. Toyd Down is well developed grassland, while the quarry was worked until about 1970. This makes the site a good subject for studying the colonisation of bare chalk next to a mature species-rich meadow. Among the early cononisers are basil thyme, carline thistle and mouse-ear hawkweed.

References

 
Sites of Special Scientific Interest in Hampshire